A gestation crate, also known as a sow stall, is a metal enclosure in which a farmed sow used for breeding may be kept during pregnancy. A standard crate measures 6.6 ft x 2.0 ft (2 m x 60 cm).

Sow stalls contain no bedding material and are instead floored with slatted plastic, concrete or metal to allow waste to be efficiently collected below. This waste is then flushed into open-air pits known as lagoons. A few days before giving birth, sows are moved to farrowing crates where they are able to lie down, with an attached crate from which their piglets can nurse.

There were 5.36 million breeding sows in the United States as of 2016, out of a total of 50.1 million pigs. Most pregnant sows in the US are kept in gestation crates. The crates are banned for new installations only in Austria and Canada, so many sows are still confined there in pig breeding facilities. They are banned in the United Kingdom, Canada, Switzerland and Sweden, and in nine states in the US (Arizona, California, Colorado, Florida, Maine, Michigan, Ohio, Oregon and Rhode Island). However, farrowing crates, in which female breeding pigs can be kept for up to five weeks, are not banned in the UK.

Opponents of the crates argue that they constitute animal abuse, while proponents say they are needed to prevent sows from fighting among themselves.

Usage

Pregnancy

Between 60 and 70 percent of sows are kept in crates during pregnancy in the United States. Each pregnancy lasts for three months, three weeks, and three days. Sows will have an average of 2.5 litters every year for two or three years, most of which is spent in the crates. They give birth to between five and eight litters before being culled from the herd. Some older sows may reach a size at which they have to sleep on their chests, unable to lie on their sides as pigs usually do. The floors are slatted to allow excrement and other waste to fall into a pit below.

Birth

A few days before giving birth, sows are moved to farrowing crates, which are slightly wider so they can lie down to nurse.  Crates have 18-in. (46-cm) "troughs" on each side where the piglets can safely lie without being in danger of sow overlay (when the sow lies down on top of a piglet).

Piglet survival also depends on selection pressure.  Groups of piglets bred for higher survival showed no difference in mortality when weaned in farrowing crates and outdoor systems.

Piglet mortality
Although farrowing crates have been used based on the assumption that they reduce piglet mortality rates, there is little published evidence in support of this claim. The most comprehensive publication to date on this subject concluded that there is no significant effect of housing on overall piglet mortality, the authors stating that "Despite the fact that the crate system has been considered to reduce piglet mortality mainly through a reduction of crushing, there is not much scientific evidence for this when considering the few large surveys that compare the mortality rate in commercial herds". The review goes on to describe several large studies dating from as early as 1983, the majority of which found no difference in piglet mortality rates between loose and crated sows. The review also details an argument as to why piglet mortality rates have been reported to be somewhat higher in a comparably small number of studies, citing methodological flaws.

Limitations on usage

Europe 
In the European Union, the crates must not be used after the fourth week of pregnancy following a 2013 EU Directive. They are illegal at all times in the United Kingdom and Sweden. However, Denmark and Norway are some of the countries where gestation crates are still used in conventional pig farming operations.

New Zealand
The use of gestation crates following mating will be phased out in New Zealand by 2015. However the crates are still legal for up to 4 weeks after farrowing. A review lead by the Ministry for Primary Industries, in 2016, found that "The current code of welfare allows for up to 5% of sows to be retained in crates for a further week (following the 4 week maximum in crates post-farrowing) as nurse sows. This
practice enables slowly growing or poorly performing piglets to be properly weaned. It has
been noted that industry does not accept or comply with this requirement and some
producers are exceeding both the maximum 5% of sows allowed to be retained for this
purpose and the amount of time that they are being retained (i.e. greater than the one
week maximum as stated in the code)." And "The current code requires that sows in any farrowing system constructed after 3 December 2010, must be provided with material that can be manipulated until farrowing (to allow
the sow to perform nesting behaviour which she is extremely motivated to do). It has been
noted by NAWAC during this review that industry disagrees with this requirement and
does not comply with this minimum standard."

North America

In 2014 Canada instituted a nationwide ban on new gestation crates. This ban however has been delayed another 5 years until 2029 and will not include existing installations.

In the United States, they have been banned in Florida since 2002, Arizona since 2006, and California since late 2008. A Rhode Island law banning the crates, passed in June 2012, took effect in June 2013. They are also being phased out in Colorado, Maine, Michigan, Ohio and Oregon. Furthermore, 2018 California Proposition 12 prohibits pork from gestation crates from being sold in California, even if they were produced elsewhere, though implementation is stayed pending litigation.

As of 2013 New Jersey had a pig population of about 9,000 none of which, according to the Humane Society, are kept in gestation crates. In survey conducted in 2013, 90% of New Jersey voters were in favor of banning the crates. In June 2013, Governor Chris Christie vetoed S1921, a bill to ban pig gestation crates. which had passed in the General Assembly with a vote of 60-5 and the Senate 29-4. An attempt to override the veto did not come to a vote. In October 2014 the New Jersey Legislature adopted S998 with a vote in the Senate of 32-1 and in the Assembly 53-13 (with 9 abstentions) On 27 November 2014 Christie vetoed the bill. A new bill was introduced in 2020.

Corporate policies
Over 60 major food companies have policies to eliminate their use.

Smithfield Foods, the largest pork producer in the United States, said in January 2007 that it will phase out gestation crates from its 187 piggeries over the next ten years because of concerns from its customers. In 2009 the company stated it would no longer be able to phase them out in ten years due to recent low sales, but reversed the decision in 2011 after intense pressure from the Humane Society of the United States.

In February 2012 McDonald's announced that it would begin working with suppliers to phase out the use of gestation crates in response to pressure from the Humane Society of the United States and other animal advocates. McDonald's purchases around one percent of all pork in the United States.

In February 2022, billionaire investor Carl Icahn pressured McDonald's board of directors to increase the speed of phasing out gestation crates.

Welfare issues

Animal welfare advocates regard the use of gestation crates as one of the most inhumane features of intensive animal production. Temple Grandin of Colorado State University's Department of Animal Science said in 2007: "... basically you're asking a sow to live in an airline seat."

Pork producers argue that gestation crates are needed because sows that are housed together in pens will fight, injuring or killing their fellow penmates. The same effect could be achieved with larger pens that kept the animals separate, but allowed them more freedom of movement. There are also other ways of reducing, but not eliminating, aggression besides gestation crates. These include eliminating overcrowding, not mixing pigs from different litters, providing straw or other bedding material, and providing sufficient food that not only meets nutritional needs but satisfies the appetite. Other important means to reduce aggression among sows rely on alternative feeding methods, as many sows will compete with each other for food.  These include trickle feeding systems, individual feeding stalls, and electronic sow feeding equipment, all of which resolve feed competition among pigs.

Early veterinary studies seemed to support the use of gestation crates. According to the U.S. National Pork Producers Council, which promotes pork as a food product and is a leading proponent of gestation crates, the American Veterinary Medical Association "recognize[s] gestation stalls and group housing systems as appropriate for providing for the well-being of sows during pregnancy." While the practice of immobilizing the animals in crates limits fighting, it subsequently increases the animals' stress levels, causing other health problems. The American Association of Swine Veterinarians adopted a position statement in 2002 specifying five standards of sow welfare and concluding, "Current scientific literature indicates that individual gestation stalls meet each of the aforementioned, provided the appropriate level of stockmanship is administered."

The Washington Post reported in 2001 that researchers have not found sows in gestation crates to have elevated levels of stress hormones. The paper notes that this suggests their overall health is not compromised. Some producers in Europe use a "free access" maternity pen configuration in which sows are in individual pens for the first four weeks of pregnancy but can "unlock" the stall by backing out and entering a common area. The producers observed that pregnant pigs will stay in the individual pens more than 90 percent of the time, and return to the same stall more than 90 percent of the time.

However, other veterinary studies contradict those earlier studies. A 1997 report of the Scientific Veterinary Committee of the European Union, where a gestation crate ban went into effect in 2013, noted that because "overall welfare appears to be better when sows are not confined throughout gestation, sows should preferably be kept in groups." Likewise in 2008, the Pew Commission on Industrial Farm Animal Production, after 2.5 years of research, recommended "the phase-out, within 10 years, of all intensive confinement systems that restrict natural movement and normal behaviors, including swine gestation crates."

Many studies have shown that sows in crates exhibit behavior such as bar-biting, head weaving, and tongue rolling, indicating chronic frustration. When given the choice, pigs will relieve themselves far away from where they sleep and eat. Sows in crates bite the bars, chew even when they have no food, and press their water bottles obsessively, all reportedly signs of boredom. The Post (uncited reference) writes that a report by veterinarians for the European Union concluded that abnormal behavior in sows "develop[s] when the animal is severely or chronically frustrated. Hence their development indicates that the animal is having difficulty in coping and its welfare is poor." This behavior, such as bar-biting and other stereotypic behavior can also lead to other physical trauma, such as sores from frequent contact with the metal bars, and mouth sores from sham-chewing and bar-biting. They also show behavior that indicates learned helplessness, according to Morris, such as remaining passive when poked or when a bucket of water is thrown over them.  A review by the Scientific Veterinary Council of the European Commission states that repetitive "stereotypical" behavior has been found in "every detailed study" of pigs in gestation crates, but not in any other housing systems examined. A 2004 literature review by animal scientists determined that sows in stalls exhibited more "stereotypical" behavior than sows in group housing, but that animals housed in stalls had lower injury rates and higher farrowing rates. Some studies have shown that "sow behavior has been shown to differ among housing systems; often it seems to be the non-housing component (i.e., direction of bar, other substances present) of the system that is responsible for the behavior displayed by the sow."

Many other health related issues are to be found among pigs confined within gestation crates as opposed to group housing systems.  Some of these include urinary tract infections, respiratory disease, skin lesions (e.g. pressure sores), excessive heat-loss, bone density, muscle health, cardiovascular health, foot injuries, damage to joints, and even lameness.

According to John Webster, head of the Veterinary School at Bristol University in the United Kingdom, "Sows on concrete in confinement stalls suffer abuse according to all the Five Freedoms." These include freedom from hunger, discomfort, pain, distress, and freedom to express normal behavior.  Sows that have to lay on concrete flooring can experience excessive heat loss and chronic physical discomfort, while this same concrete flooring can contribute to foot injuries, joint pain complications, and skin lesions  - due to the pigs prolonged contact with an unusually hard surface and chronic inactivity.

Poor cardiovascular health, bone density issues, and poor muscle health all have been attributed to lack of exercise.  The decreased amount of muscle mass  makes even simple movements difficult, while  one study found that crated sows had two thirds the bone density of non-crated sows, with researchers concluding that weakened bones led to a higher incidence of broken bones or injuries and another study finding that a common factor in mortality cases was leg weakness.  The lameness contributed to these weakened bones is also in part due to the hardness of the concrete flooring, which inevitably leads to a higher incidence of injuries to the feet and or legs, not to mention shoulder sores and abrasions to the skin from rocks, sharp edges, and bolts fastening the crates in place.  This same flooring is thought to contribute to toe lesions, with some reports claiming that up to 80% of crated sows suffer from this illness.  Due to lack of exercise, sows may develop a number of additional physical conditions that compromise their overall well-being.  Urinary tract infections may develop as a result of the pigs' immobility, which causes them to drink less frequently and consequently develop bacteria within the urinary tract.  Though this same illness is contributed to the fact that sows are forced to lie, or sit, in their own feces - another reason some think there is a higher incidence of respiratory disease among sows confined in gestation crates.

In a symposium held in 2002 on swine housing and well being, Edmond A. Pajor, Associate Professor at Purdue University, told the audience that "In gestation stalls, sows are prevented from performing many of the behavior patterns that pigs would perform in more natural or less restricted conditions resulting in a negative impact on sow welfare."

Paul Sundberg, a veterinarian and vice president of the U.S. National Pork Board, a leading proponent of gestation crates, told The Washington Post: "Farmers treat their animals well because that's just good business. The key to sow welfare isn't whether they are kept in individual crates or group housing, but whether the system used is well managed." Sundberg said: "[S]cience tells us that she [a sow] doesn't even seem to know that she can't turn ... She wants to eat and feel safe, and she can do that very well in individual stalls." Sundberg did acknowledge, however, that there is active scientific dispute about the effects of gestation crates on sows.

See also

 Veterinary ethics

References

Further reading

A comprehensive review of housing for pregnant sows Journal of the American Veterinary Medical Association, Vol. 227, No. 10, 15 November 2005. Accessed 1 August 2012.
Smith, Lewis W. "Forum—Observing Swine Behavior To Lower Piglet Mortality", Agriculture Research Service, United States Department of Agriculture.

Livestock
Ethically disputed business practices towards animals
Cruelty to animals
Buildings and structures used to confine animals
Pig farming